Allsvenskan 1931–32, part of the 1931–32 Swedish football season, was the eighth Allsvenskan season played. The first match was played 2 August 1931 and the last match was played 5 June 1932. AIK won the league ahead of runners-up Örgryte IS, while IFK Malmö and Hallstahammars SK were relegated.

Participating clubs

League table

Promotions, relegations and qualifications

Results

Top scorers

References 

Print

Online

Notes 

Allsvenskan seasons
1931–32 in Swedish association football leagues
Sweden